This is a list of the General Top 20 songs of 2011 in Mexico according to Monitor Latino. Monitor Latino also issued separate year-end charts for Regional Mexican, Pop and Anglo songs.

See also
List of number-one songs of 2011 (Mexico)
List of number-one albums of 2011 (Mexico)

References

2011 in Mexican music
Mexico top 20
Mexican record charts